The NASA Astrobiology Institute (NAI) was established in 1998 by the National Aeronautics and Space Administration (NASA) "to develop the field of astrobiology and provide a scientific framework for flight missions." In December 2019 the institute's activities were suspended.

The NAI is a virtual, distributed organization that integrates astrobiology research and training programs in concert with the national and international science communities.

History 
Although NASA had explored the idea of forming an astrobiology institute in the past, when the Viking biological experiments returned negative results for life on Mars, the public lost interest and federal funds for exobiology dried up.  In 1996, the announcement of possible traces of ancient life in the Allan Hills 84001 meteorite from Mars led to new interest in the subject.  At the same time, NASA developed the Origins Program, broadening its reach from exobiology to astrobiology, the study of the origin, evolution, distribution, and future of life in the universe.

In 1998, $9 million was set aside to fund the NASA Astrobiology Institute (NAI), an interdisciplinary research effort using the expertise of different scientific research institutions and universities from across the country, centrally linked to Ames Research Center in Mountain View, California.  Gerald Soffen former Project Scientist with the Viking program, helped coordinate the new institute.  In May, NASA selected eleven science teams, each with a Principal Investigator (PI).  NAI was established in July with Scott Hubbard as interim Director. Nobel laureate Baruch S. Blumberg was appointed the first Director of the institute, and served from May 15, 1999 – October 14, 2002.

Program 
The NASA Astrobiology Program includes the NAI as one of four components, including the Exobiology and Evolutionary Biology Program; the Astrobiology Science and Technology Instrument Development (ASTID) Program; and the Astrobiology Science and Technology for Exploring Planets (ASTEP) Program.  Program budgets for fiscal year 2008 were as follows: NAI, $16 million; Grants for the Exobiology and Evolutionary Biology Program, $11 million; ASTID, $9 million; ASTEP, $5 million.

Teams

As of 2018, the NAI has 10 teams including about 600 researchers distributed across ~100 institutions. It also has 13 international partner organizations. Some past and present teams are:

International partners
NAI has partnership program with other international astrobiology organizations to provide collaborative opportunities for its researchers within the global science community.

Associate Partners
 Spain Astrobiology Center (CAB) at the Instituto Nacional de Técnica Aeroespacial, Madrid, Spain
 Australian Centre for Astrobiology (ACA) at the University of New South Wales

Affiliate Partners
 Astrobiology Society of Britain (ASB)
 Canadian Astrobiology Network (CAN) at Centre for Planetary Science and Exploration (CPSX), at the University of Western Ontario
 European Exo/Astrobiology Network Association (EANA)
 Helmholtz Alliance: Planetary Evolution and Life
 Instituto de Astrobiología Colombia (IAC)
  Japan AstroBiology Consortium (JABC), a partnership of the Earth-Life Science Institute and the National Institutes of Natural Sciences  
 Nordic Network of Astrobiology
 Russian Astrobiology Center (RAC)
 Sociedad Mexicana de Astrobiología (SOMA)
  (SFE) 
 UK Centre for Astrobiology at The University of Edinburgh
 University of São Paulo (USP)

Research 
Selected, significant topics of interdisciplinary research by NAI as of 2008:
 Comets in space and in the laboratory
 Discovery of the "rare biosphere"
 Early habitability of Earth
 Early wet Mars
 Exoplanet discovery and analysis
 Life without the Sun
 Metal isotope tracers of environment and biology
 Methane on Mars
 Microbial mat ecology
 Modeling exoplanet biospheres
 Origins of life
 Snowball Earth
 Sub-seafloor life
 The rise of oxygen and Earth's "middle age"

References

Further reading

Research institutes in California
NASA programs
Astrobiology